Carlos Alberto Lacoste (2 February 1929 – 24 June 2004) was an Argentine navy vice-admiral and politician who briefly served as interim President of Argentina.

Earlier years

In addition to a naval career, Lacoste undertook the organization of the 1978 FIFA World Cup, hosted by Argentina.

Interim President of Argentina

In December 1981 the then head of state General Roberto Viola was ousted in a coup d'état. Lacoste served as interim President of Argentina  from 11 to  22 December 1981, during a period of military rule.

He was succeeded in the presidential office by Lieutenant General Leopoldo Galtieri.

Later years

After the military government, he preserved his connections with football associations, becoming a South American representative in FIFA, and in 1986 he was assigned as Argentine supervisor in the drawing of that year's World Cup matches in Mexico, which was eventually won by Argentina.

Death

He died on 24 June 2004 at the age of 75.

See also

 National Reorganization Process

Acting presidents of Argentina
Argentine Navy admirals
Presidents of Argentina
1929 births
2004 deaths
Lacosta, Carlos
Argentine people of French descent
20th-century Argentine politicians